Jumaa Abdullah (Arabic:جمعة عبد الله) (born 11 March 1982) is an Emirati footballer.

External links

References

Emirati footballers
1982 births
Living people
Al Ain FC players
Al-Wasl F.C. players
Al Jazira Club players
Al Dhafra FC players
Al Urooba Club players
UAE First Division League players
UAE Pro League players
Association football defenders